The 9th Infantry Brigade was a Regular Army infantry brigade of the British Army that saw active service during both the  First and Second World Wars.

History

Anglo-Russian invasion of Holland
A 9th Infantry Brigade was formed in 1799 for the Anglo-Russian invasion of Holland, and was commanded by Major-General Robert Manners. It comprised:
1st Battalion, 9th Regiment of Foot
2nd Battalion, 9th Regiment of Foot
56th Regiment of Foot
2 squadrons of the 7th Light Dragoons.

Second Boer War
A 9th Infantry brigade was formed during the Second Boer War, under the command of Major-General Reginald Pole-Carew from November 1899 until February 1900. They took part in the Battle of Modder River on 28 November 1899, as part of a force sent to relieve the Siege of Kimberley.
A battalion of the Yorkshire Light Infantry served in the brigade.

First World War
During the First World War, 9th Brigade's composition was as follows:
 1st Battalion, Northumberland Fusiliers
 4th Battalion, Royal Fusiliers
 1st Battalion, Lincolnshire Regiment (until November 1915)
 1st Battalion, Royal Scots Fusiliers (until April 1916, then to 8th Brigade)
 1/10th (Scottish) Battalion, King's (Liverpool Regiment) (from November 1914 to January 1916)
 12th (Service) Battalion, West Yorkshire Regiment (from November 1915 to February 1918)
 13th (Service) Battalion, King's (Liverpool Regiment) (joined from 8th Brigade in April 1916)
 9th Brigade Machine Gun Company (formed in February 1916, joined the 3rd MG Battalion, Machine Gun Corps in March 1918)
 9th Trench Mortar Battery (joined by May 1916)
The brigade served with the 3rd Division throughout the war, except for a brief a period in early 1915 when it exchanged places with the 85th Brigade of 28th Division.

Commanders
The commanders of the 9th Infantry Brigade during the First World War were:
Brigadier-General F. C. Shaw (At mobilization)
Brigadier-General W. Douglas Smith (12 November 1914)
Brigadier-General H. C. Potter (9 March 1916)
Brigadier-General H. C. R. Green (26 July 1916)
Brigadier-General H. C. Potter (5 August 1916)

Second World War

The 9th Infantry Brigade together with 7th Infantry Brigade and 8th Infantry Brigade formed the 3rd Infantry Division, which, at the outbreak of the Second World War in September 1939, was commanded by Major-General Bernard Montgomery. With the division the brigade was sent to France in October 1939, shortly after the outbreak of war, as part of the British Expeditionary Force, which evacuated from Dunkirk. After the evacuation, the Brigade spent four years training in the UK, in preparation for an eventual assault landing in Europe. The 3rd Infantry Division was the first British division to land at Sword on D-Day and fought through the Battle of Normandy, the Netherlands and later the invasion of Germany. During the often intense fighting from Sword to Bremen, the Division suffered 2,586 killed.

The brigade comprised:
 2nd Battalion, Lincolnshire Regiment
 1st Battalion, King's Own Scottish Borderers
 2nd Battalion, Royal Ulster Rifles

References

Sources
 

Infantry brigades of the British Army in World War I
Infantry brigades of the British Army in World War II